Al Madaribah Wa Al Arah District is the westernmost and southernmost of the 15 districts of the Lahij Governorate, Yemen. With an area of 1848.50 km2, it is also the largest of all districts within the governorate. As of the census of population on 2004-12-16, the district had a population of 45,808 inhabitants.

References

Districts of Lahij Governorate